Eve Stephenson (born September 18, 1969) is an American who competed as a road racing cyclist. She won a gold medal at the 1992 UCI Road World Championships in the team time trial. She also won silver medals in the team time trial in 1990 and 1993 and a bronze one in 1994.

References

External links
 

1969 births
Living people
American female cyclists
UCI Road World Champions (women)
21st-century American women